Artipe anna is a species of butterfly belonging to the lycaenid family described by Hamilton Herbert Druce in 1896. It is found in  Southeast Asia (Borneo, Peninsular Malaya, Sumatra)
.

Subspecies
Artipe anna anna (Borneo, Peninsular Malaya, possibly Sumatra)
Artipe anna fulva (Moulton, 1911) (Sarawak)

References

External links
"Artipe Boisduval, 1870" at Markku Savela's Lepidoptera and Some Other Life Forms

Artipe
Butterflies described in 1896